Ose is a village in Bygland municipality in Agder county, Norway. The village is located along the river Otra, just north of the lake Åraksfjorden. The Norwegian National Road 9 runs through the village.
 
The area just southeast of the waterfall is the site of Reiårsfossen Camping, which is also the location of the Ose Country Music festival. There is a traditionally-built log building in Ose called Storståga, which is used for various exhibitions.

The  is a wood-fuelled heritage steamboat that travels the route between Byglandsfjord-Bygland-Ose across the lake Byglandsfjorden and Åraksfjorden each summer.

Media gallery

References

Villages in Agder
Bygland